Hurricane Alma saw the latest development of the first storm since 1941. The first named storm of the 1962 Atlantic hurricane season, Alma formed from a tropical wave located offshore South Florida on August 26. Initially a tropical depression, it subsequently moved inland over South Florida. Impact in the state was minor, generally limited to light rainfall and rough seas. Early on August 27, the depression reemerged into the Atlantic Ocean and strengthened into Tropical Storm Alma later that day. Thereafter, it moved northeastward and remained offshore the East Coast of the United States. Alma strengthened into a hurricane on August 28, while located offshore the Outer Banks of North Carolina. In the eastern portion of the state, strong winds downed electrical poles, which caused power outages. Storm tides caused erosion in some areas. Damage in North Carolina reached $35,000 (1962 USD).

The storm continued to intensify and peaked as an  Category 1 hurricane on the Saffir–Simpson hurricane wind scale on August 28. The storm's outer bands brought rainfall, rough seas, and strong winds, especially in Massachusetts. However, the precipitation was mostly beneficial, as New England was suffering from drought conditions. In Massachusetts, strong winds caused power and telephone outages, and felled numerous trees. Rough seas offshore Massachusetts destroyed over 100 boats. Losses in New England were less than $1 million. Alma curved eastward and weakened to a tropical storm in the northwestern Atlantic on August 30. Several hours later, the storm transitioned into an extratropical cyclone while situated south of Nova Scotia.

Meteorological history

A weak circulation, associated with a tropical wave, was first observed by Television Infrared Observation Satellite (TIROS) in the eastern Atlantic Ocean on August 14. The system tracked westward and was observed by a research flight on August 18. Four days later, the system entered the Caribbean Sea and continued to remain disorganized. The wave moved across eastern Cuba on August 24, before emerging into the Straits of Florida on the following day. The system finally began to organize, and at 1200 UTC on August 26, a tropical depression developed offshore southeastern Florida coast. It traveled barely inland and emerged into the Atlantic Ocean near Fort Pierce early on August 27. The depression moved northeastward and strengthened due to its location beneath an anticyclone.

Alma steadily intensified as it paralleled the coastline of The Carolinas, becoming a hurricane on August 28 a few miles off the coast of Cape Hatteras, North Carolina. A high pressure system over Atlantic Canada caused Alma to turn east-southeastward, while weakening to a tropical storm on August 30. The high pressure system also caused the extratropical remnants to execute a cyclonic loop between August 31 and September 2. Later that day, the extratropical remnants of Alma curved northeastward, before dissipating south of Newfoundland.

Preparations and impact

In Puerto Rico, heavy rainfall associated with the precursor tropical wave produced flooding in the southeastern portion of the island. On August 25, a day before Alma developed, the precursor system brought high seas to the Atlantic coasts of Florida and Georgia; this resulted in small craft warnings from Daytona Beach, Florida to Savannah, Georgia. Additionally, the storm brought light precipitation to some areas of both states. As the storm traveled parallel to the East Coast of the United States, smalls crafts were also advised to remain in port between Edisto Island and the mouth of the Little River in South Carolina. Along the coast of that state, Alma brought gusty winds and heavy to excessive precipitation in some area, though no damage was reported.

Despite its proximity to land, the storm produced peak wind gusts of only  in Nags Head. Wind gusts downed a power pole in Hatteras, which caused an hour long power outage for one-third of the town. Damage in the state amounted to $35,000. Rainfall peaked at only  in Norfolk, causing no flooding.

In Massachusetts, the outer bands of Alma brought 40 hours of nearly continuous rainfall, as well as gale-force winds for several hours. Slick roads resulted in several traffic accidents. However, Alma produced strong waves that destroyed over 100 boats. Additionally, many cabin cruisers and smaller vessels broke loose from their moorings and smashed against the rocks. As a result, many trees fell, causing power and telephone outages, and smashing a house and parked car in Lynn. At the Civil Defense facility in Melrose, winds and rainfall short-circuited the sirens, causing them to wail for more than 2 hours. At the Fair Grounds in Topsfield, a large tent was blown down. One indirect death occurred when a woman was struck by a truck that skidded off the road in Haverhill.

Elsewhere in New England, the storm brought rainfall and  winds to coastal Rhode Island. Storm damage was reported as far north as Portsmouth, New Hampshire, while precipitation extended northward into Maine. Damage from the storm in New England was estimated at less than $1 million.

See also

Hurricane Esther (1961)
Hurricane Gerda (1969)
Hurricane Arthur (2014)
Hurricane Alex (2004)

References

External links
National Hurricane Center's Archive on Hurricane Alma

Alma
Alma
Hurricane Alma